Sudhangshu Shekhar Haldar (died on 29  September 2004) was a Bangladesh Awami League politician. He was elected a member of parliament in 1979 and 1991 from Pirojpur-1.

Career 
Haldar was elected a member of parliament in 1979 from Bakerganj-14 (extinct). He was elected to member of parliament from Pirojpur-1 in 1991.

References 

2004 deaths
People from Pirojpur District
Awami League politicians
2nd Jatiya Sangsad members
5th Jatiya Sangsad members